Qajar Iran was an Iranian empire ruled by the Qajar dynasty.

There are some derived meanings:
 Qajar dynasty in Iran
 Qajar art
 Qajars (tribe), also spelled Ghajars, Kadjars,  Kajars, Kadzhars, Cadzhars, Qachars and so on; in Azerbaijani: Qacar, an Oghuz Turkic people

Geography 

Qəcər,  Qacar, Qajar, Kajar or Kadzhar may refer to the following:

Azerbaijan
Bala Qəcər
Böyük Qəcər
Kadzhar, Agsu
Qacar, Fizuli 
Qacar Zeyid

Iran
Qajar, Khuzestan, Iran
Qajar, Zanjan, Iran
Qajar-e Takht Rostam, Iran

Vehicles 
 Renault Kadjar